The Carolina League of Minor League Baseball is a Single-A baseball league in the United States that began play in 1945. A league champion was determined at the end of each season by either postseason playoffs or being declared champion by the league office. As of 2019, the first-half and second-half winners in each division (Northern and Southern) competed in a best-of-five division series. Then, the Northern and Southern division winners played a best-of-five series to determine a league champion.

The 2020 season was cancelled due to the COVID-19 pandemic, and the league ceased operations before the 2021 season in conjunction with Major League Baseball's (MLB) reorganization of Minor League Baseball. In place of the Carolina League, MLB created the Low-A East, a 12-team circuit divided into three divisions. Prior to the 2022 season, MLB renamed the Low-A Easr as the Carolina League, and it carried on the history of the league prior to reorganization. In 2021, the Low-A East held a best-of-five series between the top two teams in the league, regardless of division standings, to determine a league champion. As of 2022, the winners of each division from both the first and second halves of the season meet in a best-of-three division series, with the winners of the two division series meeting in a best-of-three championship series.

League champions
Score and finalist information is only presented when postseason play occurred. The lack of this information indicates a declared league champion.

Championship wins by team

Notes
 Myrtle Beach and Wilmington were declared co-champions when the series was tied 2–2 and canceled because of the threat of Hurricane Floyd.
 Down East and Lynchburg were declared co-champions as a result of the playoffs being called off because of the threat of Hurricane Irma.
 The best-of-five championship series was shortened to a one-game final  due to the threat of Hurricane Florence.

References
General

Specific

Carolina League champions
Carolina League
C
Carolina League